The Islamization of Egypt occurred as a result of the Muslim conquest of Egypt by the Arabs led by the prominent Muslim general Amr ibn al-As, the military governor of the Holy Land. The masses of locals in Egypt and the rest of the Middle East underwent a large scale gradual conversion from Christianity to Islam, accompanied by jizya for those who refused to convert. This is attested to by John of Nikiû, a coptic bishop who wrote about the conquest, and who was a near contemporary of the events he described. The process of Islamization was accompanied by a simultaneous wave of Arabization. These factors resulted in Islam becoming the dominant faith in Egypt between 10th and 12th  century, Egyptians acculturating into an Islamic identity and then replacing Coptic and Greek languages, which were spoken as a result of the Greek and Roman occupation of Egypt, with Arabic as their sole vernacular which became the language of the nation by law.

Islamic links to Coptic Egypt predates its conquest by the Arabs. According to Muslim tradition, Muhammad married a Copt; Maria al-Qibtiyya. In 641 AD, Egypt was invaded by the Arabs who faced off with the Byzantine army. Local resistance by the Egyptians began to materialize during the Umayyad Caliphate and would last until at least the ninth century.

The Arabs imposed a special tax, known as jizya, for those who didn't want to accept Islam, the Christians who acquired the protected status of dhimmis, the taxation was justified on protection grounds since local Christians who kept their religion were never drafted to serve in an army. Arab rulers generally preferred not to share the rule with Coptic Christians in their towns and established new colonies, like Fustat. Heavy taxation at times of state hardships was a reason behind Coptic Christians organizing resistance against the new rulers. This resistance mounted to armed rebellions against Umayyads and abbasids in a number of instances, such as during the Bashmurian revolts in the Delta.

The Arabs in the 7th century seldom used the term Agyptos, and used instead an Arabic language version of the term Al Qibt, which was then adopted into English as Copt, to describe the locals in Egypt. They continued to use the term to refer to all Muslim and Christian Egyptians up until the Mamluk rule that legally banned the term on Muslims and associated the native language to paganism. Thus, only Christian Egyptians became known as Copts or Orthodox Copts, and also the non-Chalcedonian Egyptian Church became known as the Coptic Church. The Chalcedonian Church remained known as the Melkite Church. In Coptic, which is written using a Greek alphabet, Coptic Egyptians referred to themselves as ⲛⲓⲣⲉⲙⲛ̀ⲭⲏⲙⲓ (/ni-rem-en-kēmi/ "Egyptians"). Religious life remained largely undisturbed following the establishment of Arab rule, as evidence by the rich output of Coptic Orthodox Christian arts in monastic centers in Old Cairo (Fustat) and throughout Egypt. Conditions, however, worsened shortly after that, and in the eighth and ninth centuries when Muslim rulers banned the use of human forms in art (taking advantage of an iconoclastic conflict in the European-ruled Byzantium) and consequently destroyed many Coptic Christian paintings mainly of Jesus and frescoes in churches.

The Muslim conquest of Egypt took place in AD 639, during the Byzantine Empire. Despite the political upheaval, Egypt remained mainly Christian, but Copts lost their majority status between 10th and 12th century, as a result of the intermittent persecution and the destruction of the Christian churches there, and forced conversion to Islam. During the 14th century, the Mamluks used the intermittent persecution and the destruction of the Christian churches there, forced conversion to Islam, and accompanied by jizya for those who refused to convert.

The Fatimid period in Egypt was a time of relative tolerance. The Fatimid rulers employed Copts in the government and participated in Coptic and local Egyptian feasts. Major renovation and reconstruction of churches and monasteries were also undertaken. Coptic arts flourished, reaching new heights in Middle and Upper Egypt.

See also

 Coptic identity
 Forced conversion
 Islamization
 Spread of Islam
 Muslim conquests
 Persecution of Copts
 Pharaonist movement

References

Sources
 
 
 
 
 

Egypt
Byzantine Egypt
Forced religious conversion
Arabization
Islam in Egypt
Roman Egypt
Coptic history
Medieval Egypt
Persecution of Christians